is a 2011 Japanese CGI anime adaptation of Masamune Shirow's science fiction manga series Appleseed. Composed of 13 episodes, the series retold the exploits of E-S.W.A.T. member Deunan and her cyborg partner Briareos. The series was produced by Production I.G and under the direction of Takayuki Hamana with Junichi Fujisaku as script supervisor. All 13 episodes were compiled into two feature-length films. The first feature film titled  was announced by Shochiku and released on June 13, 2011. The second film,  was released on October 24, 2011.

A North American release of the TV series was released in June 2013. It was licensed by Funimation.

Plot

Setting
Following World War III, a global-scale conflict fought with non-nuclear weapons that almost halved the earth's population, the city-nation of Olympus stands as a beacon of hope in a world of chaos. The utopian metropolis is governed by Gaia, a vast artificial intelligence, and administered by genetically engineered humanoids known as bioroids.

Although Olympus seems like a peaceful city on the surface, racial (human vs. bioroids vs. cyborgs), religious, and political conflicts lurk underneath, threatening to overturn the delicately balanced peace of this so-called utopia.

Story
Deunan, a young female special agent, and Briareos, a veteran cyborg soldier, are both partners and lovers, as well as members of E-S.W.A.T., the elite special forces serving Olympus. They are deployed wherever trouble strikes. Conspiracy, terrorism, deadly military weapons technology, greedy corporations, and power-hungry politicians: these are just some of the threats that Deunan and Briareos must contend with as they fight to protect Olympus and conduct their personal quest to find Eden in the wasteland.

As Olympus is carrying forward the Ark Project, aimed to preserve the future of human kind under bioroids' supervision, the Human Liberation Front is strongly opposing the plan and the very existence of the bioroids. The Front is supported by a radical fringe known as the Argonauts, a terrorist group hiding inside a legendary self-propelled city-fortress. But very little is known about the Argonauts, and their leader, Alcides is a man who reportedly died when the maritime industrial nation of Poseidon bombed the Argonauts' fortress, 20 years before.

Characters
 
 
Deunan is a young woman of both African and Caucasian descent and the daughter of an American Securities officer named Carl Knute. Her mother was gunned down for crossing a street designated for white people. After that day, her father began drilling her in combat and survival skills to the point where she became a mercenary. During her training, she encountered Briareos, a former puppet for a KGB linked terrorist group. The two began training together and eventually became lovers.
  / 
 
Originally, an African man from the Mediterranean, Briareos was used as a terrorist by the KGB while still a child. He sought political asylum in the former USA after killing the unit's commander of operations - for which he was put on the international "most wanted" list as an assassin. After meeting an agent from Special Security Forces, he began operating as a partner with the man's daughter, Deunan Knute. Caught in an explosion, the 31-year-old survived only by undergoing a full cyborg body replacement - and has been making modifications ever since. Briareos is a Hekatonkheires Combat Model cyborg.
 
 
 
 
 
 
 
 
 Deia Chades

Media

Anime
Takayuki Hamana directed the anime at various companies in cooperation with Production I.G. Junichi Fujisaku supervised and co-wrote the scripts, and Takayuki Goto designed the characters based on Shirow's original work. Atsushi Takeuchi led mechanical design efforts.

Appleseed XIII was released in Japan as a 13-episode OVA series and was compiled into two theatrical feature films. The first feature film titled Appleseed XIII: Tartaros was released on June 13, 2011. The second, titled Appleseed XIII: Ouranos was released on October 24, 2011. During the release of the feature films, limited edition first Blu-ray volumes were being sold in theatres and the episodes were being streamed online.

A 2-disc soundtrack was released under catalog number KICA-3146 on October 26, 2011, by King Records (Japan).

The names of episodes 1 to 12 are a direct reference to the Twelve Labours of Hercules.

Manga
A manga adaptation titled  by Akira Miyagawa was published by Kodansha and was serialized in Monthly Afternoon magazine from October 25, 2011 to April 25, 2013. The manga was collected into three volumes released on April 23, 2012, December 21, 2012 and May 23, 2013.

References

External links
 
 

2011 anime ONAs
Japanese adult animated films
Appleseed (media franchise)
Funimation
Kodansha manga
Production I.G
Science fiction anime and manga
Seinen manga

ja:アップルシード